John J. Walsh (11 February 1901 – 12 June 1965) was an English footballer who played as a right back.

Career
Walsh played locally with Darwen gaining Lancashire County honours before joining Blackburn Rovers. He moved to Aberdare Athletic in July 1925. Alex Raisbeck signed Jack Walsh in December 1926 for Bristol City.

Honours
with Bristol City
Football League Third Division South winner: 1926–27

References

1901 births
1965 deaths
Footballers from Blackburn
English footballers
Association football fullbacks
Darwen F.C. players
Blackburn Rovers F.C. players
Aberdare Athletic F.C. players
Millwall F.C. players
Bristol City F.C. players
English Football League players